The Scarlet Web is a 1954 British crime film directed by Charles Saunders and starring Griffith Jones, Hazel Court and Zena Marshall.

The film was made at Walton Studios with some location shooting in London. Its sets were designed by the art director John Stoll.

Cast

References

Bibliography
 Chibnall, Steve & McFarlane, Brian. The British 'B' Film. Palgrave MacMillan, 2009.

External links

1954 films
British crime films
1954 crime films
Films directed by Charles Saunders
Films shot at Nettlefold Studios
British black-and-white films
Films shot in London
1950s English-language films
1950s British films